Michael de Sanctis (29 September 1591 – 10 April 1625), sometimes called Michael of the Saints, was a Discalced Trinitarian born in Vic, a city of Catalonia, Spain.

Born Michael Argemir, at the age of twelve, he came to Barcelona and asked to be received into the monastery of the Trinitarians there. After a three-year novitiate, he took his vows at that order's monastery of St. Lambert at Zaragoza in  1607. After meeting a Discalced Trinitarian one day, he felt drawn to that congregation's more austere lifestyle and, after much deliberation and the permission of his superior, he entered the congregation of the Discalced Trinitarians at Madrid as a novice.  He then took his vows at Alcalá, became a priest, and was twice elected superior of the monastery at Valladolid, where he died.

During his life, Michael de Sanctis led a life of prayer and mortification.  He was devout towards the Holy Eucharist, and is said to have been experienced ecstasies several times during Consecration.

Michael De Sanctis was beatified by Pope Pius VI on 24 May 1779 and later canonized by Pope Pius IX on 8 June 1862. His feast day is celebrated on 10 April. In images, he is usually depicted kneeling before an altar where the Blessed Sacrament is exposed.

The municipality of Saint-Michel-des-Saints, Quebec, Canada, is named in his honor.

References

1591 births
1625 deaths
Catalan Roman Catholic saints
Trinitarian saints
17th-century Spanish Roman Catholic priests
17th-century Christian saints
Canonizations by Pope Pius IX
Beatifications by Pope Pius VI